The following is a list of football-related statues.

List

See also

List of Australian rules football statues

Notes
  It does not include any busts, friezes, figurines, medallions, cameos or deathmasks.

References

External links
World Football Statue Database
Lists of visual art topics
Association football
Statues
 
association football